Rocca may refer to:

Rocca (surname)
Rocca (fortification), a fortifiable stronghold
Rocca (crater), a lunar crater
Rocca (French rapper) (born 1975), French–Colombian rapper

Places
Municipalities (comuni) of Italy

Rocca Canavese, in the province of Turin
Rocca Canterano, in the province of Rome
Rocca Cigliè, in the province of Cuneo
Rocca d'Arazzo, in the province of Asti
Rocca d'Arce, in the province of Frosinone
Rocca de' Baldi, in the province of Cuneo
Rocca de' Giorgi, in the province of Pavia
Rocca d'Evandro, in the province of Caserta
Rocca di Botte, in the province of L'Aquila
Rocca di Cambio, in the province of L'Aquila
Rocca di Cave, in the province of Rome
Rocca di Mezzo, in the province of L'Aquila
Rocca di Neto, in the province of Crotone
Rocca di Papa, in the province of Rome
Rocca Grimalda, in the province of Alessandria
Rocca Imperiale, in the province of Cosenza
Rocca Massima, in the province of Latina
Rocca Pia, in the province of L'Aquila
Rocca Pietore, in the province of Belluno
Rocca Priora, in the province of Rome
Rocca San Casciano, in the province of Forlì-Cesena
Rocca San Felice, in the province of Avellino
Rocca San Giovanni, in the province of Chieti
Rocca Santa Maria, in the province of Teramo
Rocca Santo Stefano, in the province of Rome
Rocca Sinibalda, in the province of Rieti
Rocca Susella, in the province of Pavia
Roccabascerana, in the province of Avellino
Roccabernarda, in the province of Crotone
Roccabianca, in the province of Parma
Roccabruna, in the province of Cuneo
Roccacasale, in the province of L'Aquila
Roccadaspide, in the province of Salerno
Roccafiorita, in the province of Messina
Roccafluvione, in the province of Ascoli Piceno
Roccaforte del Greco, in the province of Reggio Calabria
Roccaforte Ligure, in the province of Alessandria
Roccaforte Mondovì, in the province of Cuneo
Roccaforzata, in the province of Taranto
Roccafranca, in the province of Brescia
Roccagiovine, in the province of Rome
Roccagloriosa, in the province of Salerno
Roccagorga, in the province of Latina
Roccalbegna, in the province of Grosseto
Roccalumera, in the province of Messina
Roccamandolfi, in the province of Isernia
Roccamena, in the province of Palermo
Roccamonfina, in the province of Caserta
Roccamontepiano, in the province of Chieti
Roccamorice, in the province of Pescara
Roccanova, in the province of Potenza
Roccantica, in the province of Rieti
Roccapalumba, in the province of Palermo
Roccapiemonte, in the province of Salerno
Roccarainola, in the province of Naples
Roccaraso, in the province of L'Aquila
Roccaromana, in the province of Caserta
Roccascalegna, in the province of Chieti
Roccasecca, in the province of Frosinone
Roccasecca dei Volsci, in the province of Latina
Roccasicura, in the province of Isernia
Roccasparvera, in the province of Cuneo
Roccaspinalveti, in the province of Chieti
Roccastrada, in the province of Grosseto
Roccavaldina, in the province of Messina
Roccaverano, in the province of Asti
Roccavignale, in the province of Savona
Roccavione, in the province of Cuneo
Roccavivara, in the province of Campobasso

Civil parishes (frazioni) of Italy

Rocca Cilento, in the municipality of Lustra (SA)
Rocca di Fondi, in the municipality of Antrodoco (RI)
Roccacannuccia, in the municipality of Nardò (LE)
Roccapassa, in the municipality of Amatrice (RI)
Roccapietra, in the municipality of Varallo Sesia (VC)
Roccapipirozzi, in the municipality of Sesto Campano (IS)
Roccaporena, in the municipality of Cascia (PG)
Roccatederighi, in the municipality of Roccastrada (GR)
Rocca di Manerba del Garda, in the municipality of Manerba del Garda (BS)

See also
Roca (disambiguation)
Roccaforte (disambiguation)
Rocchetta (disambiguation)
Della Rocca (disambiguation)